Elections to Salford Council were held on 6 May 1999. One third of the council was up for election.  The Labour Party kept overall control of the councill. Overall turnout was 21.85%.

After the election, the composition of the council was:
Labour 56
Liberal Democrat 4

Election result

|}

Ward results

References

1999
1999 English local elections
1990s in Greater Manchester